Alexis Rafael Pérez Fontanilla (born 25 March 1994) is a Colombian professional footballer who plays as a defender for Turkish club Giresunspor.

Personal life
Since 2014, Pérez has been in a relationship with English lawyer and model Leanne Shillingford, whom he met while playing in Spain.

Career

Uniautónoma
Pérez made his professional debut in 2013 while playing for Uniautónoma.

Villarreal B/Real Valladolid (loan)
Late, he was loaned at Spanish teams Villarreal and Real Valladolid.

Atlético Junior
In 2015, Pérez returns to Uniautónoma, and then, in 2016 he signs out for Atlético Junior.

Querétaro F.C.
On 20 June 2017, Mexican club Querétaro F.C. announced the $2.7 Million dollar signing of Pérez on a four-year contract.

On August 5, 2017 Pérez made his first Liga MX appearance against Tigres UANL ending in a 1-1 draw.

Honours 
Uniautónoma
 Categoría Primera B (1): 2013

References

External links 

 

1994 births
Living people
Sportspeople from Barranquilla
Colombian footballers
Expatriate footballers in Spain
Colombian expatriate footballers
Villarreal CF B players
Real Valladolid Promesas players
Uniautónoma F.C. footballers
Querétaro F.C. footballers
Giresunspor footballers
Liga MX players
Süper Lig players
Expatriate footballers in Mexico
Expatriate footballers in Turkey
Association football defenders
Colombia international footballers